Jim Jones (September 17, 1922 – October 3, 2012) is a former American politician from Idaho. Jones is a former Republican member of Idaho House of Representatives.

Early life
On September 17, 1922, Jones was born in Birmingham, Alabama. His parents were William Henry and Nannie Jones. He had two elder siblings. In 1942, he graduated from Jones Valley High School.

Education
Jones attended University of Alabama in 1946 studying prelaw. In 1972, he earned a Bachelor of Arts degree in Social Science from Boise State University.

Career
Jones served in the United States Navy as an Aviation Radioman on a Consolidated PBY Catalina patrol airplane. He also served as a chief warrant officer in the United States Army Criminal Investigation Division from about 1948 until 1965.

On November 5, 1996, Jones won the election and became a Republican member of Idaho House of Representatives for District 20, seat B. Jones defeated Sher Sellman with 51.6% of the votes.

Personal life
Jones' wife is Loretta J. Jones. They have one child. He and his family live in Mountain Home, Idaho.

On October 3, 2012, Jones died in Mountain Home, Idaho. Jones was cremated.

References

1922 births
2012 deaths
Republican Party members of the Idaho House of Representatives
People from Mountain Home, Idaho
United States Navy sailors
United States Army officers